Jeperjek is a small settlement in the hills southwest of Boštanj in the Municipality of Sevnica in central Slovenia. The part of the municipality on the right bank of the Sava River was traditionally part of the traditional region of Lower Carniola. The entire municipality is now included in the Lower Sava Statistical Region.

References

External links
Jeperjek at Geopedia

Populated places in the Municipality of Sevnica